Ray Kippari is a retired Canadian professional darts player who competed in the 1970s & 1980s. He competed in the 1982 BDO World Darts Championship but was defeated by the American darts player Nicky Virachkul in the first round.

Career
Kippari winner of the 1978 Canadian Masters beating Allan Hogg of fellow Canada.

World Championship Results

BDO
 1982: Last 32: (lost to Nicky Virachkul 0–2) (sets)

External links
Darts Database

Canadian darts players
Living people
Year of birth missing (living people)
British Darts Organisation players